The Ouertanis are one of the biggest Tunisian tribes of Amazigh Berber origins. Their history goes back to ancient times. They are mainly located in northwest Tunisia.
The majority of this tribe were in the colonial era of Tunisia (1881 – 1956) among the national freedom fighters Fellagha, who raised arms against the French occupation in order to defend and liberate their country. The Hajji Ben Abdelmalik El Ouertani became famous because had organized weapons, ammunition and food for all Fellegha.

Diachronic Linguistics 
"Urti" is a word in the Amazigh language which means "orchard" in English. "Wurtan" or "Ouertan" is the plural form of the word with a definite article and means "the orchards" in the Amazigh language and is at the same time the name of the tribe. The historical evidence is that orchards are abundant in the town of Sra Ouertan south of the town of Kef. The Berber tribe Ouertan had considerable influence in the pre-Islamic era and lived together with the Romans. The word "Ouertani" is formed from the Amazigh word "Ouertan" using Arabic grammar to say "related to Ouertan" or "in connection with Ouertan". Ouertanis living today in Tunisia speak Arabic with a Tunisian dialect as their mother tongue and are Sunni Muslims.

Geography 
They have the Tunisian surname Ouertani, which is widespread in the cities of Kef, Kairouan and Tunis. Some Ouertanis emigrated to France in the 1890s and during the colonial period (1881–1956). At least 197 individuals with the surname Ouertani have been born in France since 1890. Ouertani is the 49,565th most frequent surname in France. In Germany, there are now estimated to be 24 people with the surname Ouertani. According to Namespedia, the Ouertanis live today in at least 14 countries around the world.

Notable Individuals 
There are many famous Ouertanis such as Mohamed Almokkdad Ben Naceur Ben Ammar Ouertani (historian, author), Lassaad Ouertani (football player), Naoufel Ouertani (TV presenter), Dr. Mustapha Ouertani (social scientist), Dr. Rachid Ouertani (physicist, politician) and also Bilel Ouertani who gave up his engineering career to become the world greatest elevator operator.

References and sources 
 Ouertani cited under the most important Berber tribes of northwest Tunisia (in Arabic)
 Book: The Burnos (Berber man dress) in Paris by Almokdad Ouertani (in Arabic)
 Ouertanis in France (in French)
 Ouertanis in Germany (in German)
 Chancellor Merkel honored Wetzlar social scientist (in German)
 The mountains of Sra Ouertan (Video in Arabic)
 Distribution of Ouertanis in the world based on a sample statistic
 The Ouertani in the world today
 Ouertani a clear Berber family name (in Arabic)

Berber peoples and tribes